Azerbaijan Investment Holding (AIH) is a public legal entity that carries out activities in the field of management of state-owned companies and enterprises, economic enterprises with a state share of participation based on common principles.

History 
The authorized capital of the Azerbaijan Investment Holding is ten million manats.

According to the Decree of the President of Azerbaijan list of state-owned enterprises given under management of AIH was approved.

Management 

The governing bodies of AIH are the Supervisory Board and Management Board. The Supervisory Board consists of five members – the Chairman of the Board and other members appointed and dismissed by the President of the Republic of Azerbaijan.

The Management Board consists of five members - the Chairman of the Executive Board and other members. The Chairman of the Management Board is appointed and dismissed by the President of the Republic of Azerbaijan. One of the members of the Board is also AIH CEO. Other members of the Executive Board, including CEO, shall be appointed and dismissed by the Supervisory Board on the recommendation of the SB Chairman .

The Chairman of the Supervisory Board is the Prime Minister of Azerbaijan Ali Asadov.

Members of the Supervisory Board:

 Assistant to the President - Head of the Department for Economic Affairs and Innovation Development Policy of the Presidential Administration of Azerbaijan 
 Assistant to the President - Head of the Department of Economic Policy and Industry of the Presidential Administration of Azerbaijan
 Minister of Economy of Azerbaijan
 Minister of Finance of Azerbaijan.

AIH Activity 
By the Decree of the President of the Republic of Azerbaijan dated , a number of state-owned companies and enterprises with a state share are included in the management of AIH.

On Mai 8,2021 President made Amendments to the Decree “On improving the structure of the State Oil Company of the Republic of Azerbaijan” (https://president.az/articles/51420). According to the amendments, the structure of SOCAR shall be approved by the Azerbaijan Investment Holding (“AIH”) in coordination with the President of the Republic of Azerbaijan.

State-owned enterprises under AIH management

 State Oil Company of Azerbaijan
 "Azerbaijan Airlines" CJSC
 "Azerbaijan Railways" CJSC
 "Azerbaijan Caspian Shipping Company" CJSC
 "Baku Metro” CJSC
 "Azergold" CJSC
 "Azerenerji" OJSC
 ·"Azersu" OJSC
 "Azerishig" OJSC
 "Azerbaijan Amelioration and Water Management” OJSC
 "International Bank of Azerbaijan" OJSC
 "Azer-Turk Bank" OJSC
 "Azeristiliktedzhizat" OJSC
 "Tamiz Shahar" OJSC
 "Baku International Commercial Sea Port" OJSC
 State Insurance Commercial Company of Azerbaijan
 "BakuBus" LLC.

See also 
Investment in Azerbaijan

References 

Economy of Azerbaijan